These American television shows premiered in 2020.

Shows

Miniseries

Television films and specials

References

2020 in American television
2020-related lists
Mass media timelines by year